The 2007–08 Liga Indonesia Premier Division (also known as the Liga Djarum Indonesia for sponsorship reasons) was the 13th season of the Liga Indonesia Premier Division as well as its final season as the top Indonesian professional league for association football clubs.

Overview
It was contested by 36 teams. The season began on 10 February 2007 and the last games played on 10 February 2008. and Sriwijaya F.C. won the championship.

Teams

Promoted from First Division
Persebaya
Persis
Persma
PSSB
Pelita Jaya
Persiraja
Perseman
Persikabo

Stadiums and locations

First stage

West Division

East Division

Second stage

Group A

Group B

Knockout stage

Semifinals

Final

Awards

Top scorers

This is a list of the top scorers from the 2007–08 season.

Best player
 Zah Rahan Krangar (Sriwijaya)

References

External links
Indonesia – List of final tables (RSSSF)

Top level Indonesian football league seasons
Indonesian Premier Division seasons
1
Indonesia